My Special Love is the second studio album by American singer-songwriter La Toya Jackson. Released in 1981, the album peaked at #175 on the Billboard 200 albums chart. After the album's limited success, it fell into obscurity, receiving a limited re-release on CD in Japan in the early 1990s, which was quickly deleted. The album was the rarest album from LaToya but was re-released on CD in 2019 by Cherry Pop Records including several bonus tracks, among them "If You Feel the Funk" (7" Version) from her debut solo album.

Background
Allmusic called it "the defining album of Jackson's career", also stating that "Though her voice isn't particularly strong, Jackson makes up for what she lacks in power with an energetic, uninhibited approach to the music. Benefiting from solid R&B-funk arrangements and the well-rounded production of Ollie E. Brown, her second album is a flavorful mixture of lively uptempo romps and smooth-sailing slow jams."

The first single from the album was "Stay The Night", a cover of the 1980 Billy Ocean single, and was moderately successful. The second and final single was "I Don't Want You To Go", previously recorded by Lani Hall, which had a limited release and failed to chart. The album also includes rare groove classic "Camp Kuchi Kaiai", co-written with sister Janet who also contributes background vocals. Brother Randy produced two tracks on the album - their duet "Giving You Up" and the title track "My Special Love" which Randy later re-recorded with R&B star Betty Wright for her 1983 album Wright Back At You.

Track listing

Expanded edition

Charts

References

1981 albums
La Toya Jackson albums
Polydor Records albums
Disco albums by American artists